Tondirahu is an island in Estonia.

See also
List of islands of Estonia

  

Islands of Estonia
Ridala Parish